William Howard Keenan III (born April 15, 1986 in New York, New York) is an American author, screenwriter, and former professional ice hockey player who last played for IF Sundsvall of HockeyAllsvenskan. As of February 2019, he has served as chief operating officer of Graydon Carter's Air Mail.

Early career
Keenan played for the New York Apple Core of the Eastern Junior Hockey League from 2003-2005.  He was voted an EJHL All Star during the 2004-05 season along with his former Apple Core teammate and current NHL defenseman Matt Gilroy. Keenan was originally drafted by the Hull Olympiques of the QMJHL but opted to forego major junior hockey and pursue the NCAA route.  On December 4, 2004 he committed to play his collegiate hockey at Harvard University. He was ranked #207 among North American skaters in the 2005 NHL Central Scouting Bureau rankings.

College career
Keenan made his collegiate debut on November 5, 2005 against Princeton University at Baker Rink. He scored his first collegiate goal against St. Lawrence University on November 4, 2006 against Alex Petizian at the Bright Arena. Keenan was hampered by numerous injuries in college. He was a college roommate of professional soccer player Mike Fucito.

Professional career 
After a short stint playing for the Turnhout White Caps of the Belgian first division, Keenan signed with EHC Neuwied of the German Oberliga for the remainder of the 2009-10 season.  He tallied 15 goals and 14 assists in 14 games played.

Keenan began the pre-season playing with Kiekko-Laser in the Finnish Mestis. On September 11, 2010, he signed a contract with Lindlövens IF of the Swedish Division 1.  He went on to record 8 goals and 2 assists in 32 games.

On August 13, 2011 Keenan reportedly signed a one-year contract with Kramfors-Alliansen of Hockeyettan. It was also rumored he had agreed on a contract with HC Vita Hästen.  On October 19, 2011 in a game against Östersunds IK, Keenan delivered a check to current Frölunda HC defenseman Emil Djuse. Keenan was suspended five games for an illegal check to the head. Playing alongside former HockeyAllsvenskan forward Johan Chang, Keenan produced 22 goals, 28 assists for 50 points while racking up 117 penalty minutes in 32 games while Chang piled up 28 goals and 37 assists for 65 points in 40 games. Keenan finished second among North Americans in league scoring behind Andrew Fournier.  Teammate and fellow American Dean Moore finished first among defenseman in scoring.  Keenan also finished second among North Americans in penalty minutes. Following the season, Kramfors-Alliansen transferred both Keenan and Moore's rights to IF Sundsvall of HockeyAllsvenskan before signing forward Mike Danton to a one-year contract.

Career statistics

Writing 
Keenan's first book, Odd Man Rush: A Harvard Kid's Hockey Odyssey from Central Park to Somewhere in Sweden—with Stops along the Way, was published by Skyhorse Publishing in January 2016. Vanity Fair published an excerpt from the book in December 2015 calling it "an uproarious new memoir." The Boston Globe reviewed the book, saying "Odd Man Rush is a unique item on the bookshelf...Keenan understands the culture [of hockey] and captures it well." The Buffalo News called it "Ball Four meets hockey." The New York Post called it "a bawdy, often comical chronicle of hockey and survival in far-flung places...the international version of the movie Slap Shot." SB Nation reviewed it, stating "Make no mistake. This is a funny book, but Keenan also has a gift for writing from a place of vulnerability...That being said, you will still find yourself smirking your way through most of Keenan's story."

Academy Award-nominated producer Howard Baldwin acquired the film rights to Odd Man Rush, and the project was reported to be in production in February 2019. The Athletic reported the film was in post-production in August 2019 with Creative Artists Agency representing the movie's distribution rights.

Post Hill Press published his second book, Discussion Materials: Tales of a Rookie Wall Street Investment Banker.

His writing has been featured in Vanity Fair, The Huffington Post, Sports Illustrated, and Yahoo! Sports. He is also a frequent contributor to Stan Fischler's The Fischler Report.

His resignation email from Deutsche Bank went viral and was published by Dealbreaker.

Filmography

Film

Personal
Keenan was born and raised in Manhattan's Upper East Side. He is an alum of St. Bernard's School and Collegiate School. Keenan graduated from Harvard University in 2009 and received his MBA from Columbia Business School in 2016. Upon completion of his MBA, he took a job as an investment banker at Deutsche Bank.

References

External links

Bill Keenan Fights

1986 births
American men's ice hockey right wingers
American male non-fiction writers
American memoirists
Harvard Crimson men's ice hockey players
Ice hockey players from New York (state)
Living people
St. Bernard's School alumni
Columbia Business School alumni